Tekno the Robotic Puppy (also known as Teksta the Robotic Puppy) is a popular electronic robotic toy which originally launched in late 2000. Tekno sold more than 7 million units in its first season and went on to sell more than 40 million units in its original 4 years of production.  The worldwide popularity for Tekno led to prominent awards and widespread media coverage which included newspaper articles, television and film appearances, and a stand-alone feature on the cover of Time magazine.

It had more than 160 emotions and functions. Tekno's basic functions included walking, barking, eating, and sleeping, and special motor sensors enabled emotional and lifelike intelligence. It could be "taught" to respond to voice commands and to perform real dog tricks such as fetching, whining, and playing tricks with the included bone and ball accessories. Smart light sensor technology also gave Tekno the ability to understand visual commands and to react to environmental stimuli, even knowing when to go to sleep on its own. Since 2013, the new Teksta was released by Character Toys in the UK, and Tekno is controlled by a smart device like iPad, Android phone, and Windows Phone 8. As of 2016, a 5th Generation version will be slated to be released.

Development 

Developed by Bob Del Principe, Brian Dubinksy, and designer Gary Leynes, Tekno launched in the fall of 2000 retailing for $39.99. Marketing efforts included a national television commercial campaign, traditional public relations, live talk show appearances, and the creation of the Institute of Robotic Technology to promote the world of robotics.

Entering a crowded toy pet market which included Rocket the Wonder Dog from Fisher Price, and Poo-Chi, from Tiger Electronics and SEGA, Tekno was named the best puppy for its value by Jim Silver of the popular magazine Toy Wishes.

Later robots 
Additional pets and robots were launched. Other than Tekno the Newborn Puppy, the smaller version of Tekno. Here are the following robots ToyQuest/Genesis Toys launched:

Tekno the Newborn Puppy 

The spin-off of Tekno the robotic puppy. Similar to the 2013 version, it comes with a ball instead of a card trick.

Kitty the Tekno Kitten

2001 
Originally sold exclusively to Toys “R” Us, Kitty the Tekno Kitten launched in 2001 and was advertised as the perfect companion to Tekno the Robotic Puppy.  In addition to the smart technology included in the robotic puppy, Kitty included color-changing eyes to show different emotions. Kitty also came in several different colors and breeds making each one unique.

2007 
The new version of Kitty the Tekno Kitten was renamed "Tekno the Robotic Kitty". Comes with a remote control.

2014 
A new version of Kitty the Tekno Kitten was launched in the UK in July 2014 and was expected to be released in the US in December 2014 and comes with pink color. Despite flipping, she pounces. Comes with a mouse with flashing eyes.

Baby Kitty the Tekno Newborn Kitten and daMouse the Tekno Mouse 

It is the same prototype as the original Kitty and the Tekno mouse is "daMouse". daMouse is the robotic mouse who loves to race around and be chased by Kitty. It comes with cheese, fish, and small mouse.

Polly the Tekno Parrot 

The third release in Tekno and Friends pet line was Polly, the Tekno Parrot. In comparison to previous Tekno pets, Polly was an edgier talkative robot with special voice learning technology to mimic and repeat its owner's words. Polly also came with a cage that doubled as a charging station for its batteries.

Rex and Steg, Fighting Tekno Dinosaurs 

The fourth release in Tekno and Friends pet line which was released in 2003. They fight and win. Rex comes with a bone, and Steg comes with a leaf.

Tekno Dinkie Robots/Teksta Dotbot Robotic Family 

The fifth release in Tekno and Friends robot line were Fubo^Kie, Jibo^Kie, Suki^Kie, Oto^Kie, Koukou^Kie, and Bikou^Kie. These artificial intelligence and voice activated robots interact with each other and talk in "Dinkish" language. They are like astronauts but with the sound sensors and red fuel buttons. Every robot likes to walk except Koukou^Kie (he rocks left and right). The game modes in each Dinkie Robot are clock, alarm, song, game, status, brush teeth, anti-virus, and walk. In the United Kingdom, it is Teksta Dotbots. And in Japan, it is Palbo Dinka Robots created by Tomy.

Battling Tekno Saber Scarab 

The sixth release in Tekno and Friends pet line was a saber scarab. Comes with a remote control.

Boomer the Robotic Puppy 

The first Tekno 2.0 pet which is a beagle or dalmatian. Comes with a ball and steak.

Mack the Robotic Fish 

The second Tekno 2.0 pet which swims on floor surface and table surface. Does not swim in water.

Roscoe the Robotic Frog 

The third Tekno 2.0 pet who leaps everywhere. Comes with a lilypad and a fly hooked on it.

Flash the Robotic Turtle 

The fourth Tekno 2.0 pet who walks slow. Comes with the lake. If the owner takes off his shell, he would say "Uh Oh!".

Tekno the Robotic Pony 

The 2007 release in the Tekno and Friends pet line. Tekno gallops, and loves to eat apples.

Tekno Mega Mech R/C Robot 48-Inch 

An inflatable huge Tekno robot who was like a balloon. Comes with a remote control and rolls instead of walks.

Sakura: Best Friend Robot 

Originally sold by Toys R'Us, Walmart, KB Toys, Amazon, and Target.com. The 2007 release in the Tekno and Friends robot line was Sakura. Sakura interact with girls or boys and answers yes and no questions, doing fortune telling, knows funny facts, fashion, keeping secrets using her key and remote, and dances on a robotic scooter. Sakura comes with a robotic scooter, remote, key with keychain, and bouquet.

Playful Pup Tekno 

The 2007 release in the Tekno and Friends Pet line was a beagle. It was controlled by remote and comes with a magnetic ball or bone.

Tekno Newborns

2007 
The 2007 release in the Tekno and Friends Pet line were puppy, kitten, elephant, and monkey. The puppy comes with the bone, kitty comes with the mouse, elephant comes with the haystack, and the monkey comes with the banana.

2015 
The 2015 release in the Tekno and Friends Pet line were only a puppy and a kitty.

2016 
The 2016 release in the Tekno Newborns includes multiple metallic colors for newborn puppy and new born kitty.

Tekno Robotic T-Rex 
Same as Rex: Fighting Tekno Dinosaur, this is the 2014 release of the Tekno and Friends robot line. He comes with a disconnectable bone. If the owner makes his mouth open and gives him a bone, he will chew it, and launch it away with an almighty burp.

Tekno Robotic Scorpion 
The 2015 release in the Tekno and Friends line was a scorpion. Features a sting in the tail (a pretend one!), this aggressive little character has an added level of electronic interaction. Comes with a clever IR hand controller that straps to the users hand, waving movements are translated into 360˚ movements on the Scorpion. Multi-channel operation means that two or more of these fearsome characters can fight each other and battle for victory using their giant pincer hands.

Tekno Robotic Toucan 
The 2016 release in the Tekno and Friends line was a toucan. This incredible bird has been fitted with the newest ultra-sensitive voice recognition chip for even greater control and sophistication.

Tekno Babies 
The 2017 release in the Tekno and Friends line were every single pet; puppies, kittens, dinosaurs, and raccoons. They are all in small versions, but they contain tracks to run on.

Timeline of editions 
 The 2000 version comes with silver, gold, and dalmatian.
 The 2007 version comes with white, silver, dalmatian, beagle, red, and purple.
 The 2013 version comes with blue, pink, dalmatian, and Scooby-Doo.
 The 2016 version comes with black and also available in the Newborns variety with new colors.
 The 2019 version is known to be 360.

See also
Cindy Smart
Musio

References

Toy robots